Gold Mountain Casino is a Native American casino in Ardmore, Oklahoma, owned and operated by the Chickasaw Nation. Originally opened in 2002 as Ardmore Gaming, the facility has grown steadily and today features more than 300 gaming machines. The casino is open 24 hours a day, seven days a week. The  casino is located on the corner of P Street N.E. and Sam Noble Parkway, and can be accessed via Interstate 35, exit 33. It is located near the Ardmore Convention Center and the Hardy Murphy Coliseum. Gold Mountain is about 34 miles north of WinStar World Casino in Thackerville, Oklahoma, and 77 miles south of Riverwind Casino in Norman, Oklahoma, which are also Chickasaw-owned gaming facilities.

References 

Chickasaw Nation casinos
Casinos in Oklahoma
Ardmore, Oklahoma
Buildings and structures in Carter County, Oklahoma
Tourist attractions in Carter County, Oklahoma
Casinos completed in 2002
2002 establishments in Oklahoma